The Republic of Ireland national under-23 football team, is the national under-23 football team of the Republic of Ireland. It is organised by the Football Association of Ireland.

The current Republic of Ireland Under-23 team is restricted to home based players and is effectively a League of Ireland XI. Since 2007 it has represented the Republic of Ireland in the International Challenge Trophy.

Matches

Friendlies

2007-09 International Challenge Trophy

2009-11 International Challenge Trophy

References

External links
 www.fai.ie

under-23
under-23
Ireland